Andrés Mir Bel (born 25 January 1987) is a Spanish former field hockey player who played as a defender or midfielder for the Spanish national team.

At the 2012 Summer Olympics he competed with the Spanish national field hockey team in the men's tournament.

Career
Mir played for CD Terrassa before he joined Club de Campo. In 2013 and 2014 he played two seasons for the Delhi Waveriders in the Hockey India League. In 2015 he left Club de Campo for Bloemendaal in the Dutch Hoofdklasse. After one season he returned to Club de Campo. After the 2021–22 season he retired from playing top-level hockey.

References

External links
 

1987 births
Living people
Spanish male field hockey players
Sportspeople from Zaragoza
Male field hockey defenders
Male field hockey midfielders
2010 Men's Hockey World Cup players
Field hockey players at the 2012 Summer Olympics
2014 Men's Hockey World Cup players
Field hockey players at the 2016 Summer Olympics
Olympic field hockey players of Spain
Hockey India League players
Delhi Waveriders players
Club de Campo Villa de Madrid players
División de Honor de Hockey Hierba players
HC Bloemendaal players
Men's Hoofdklasse Hockey players